The Danger Room is a fictional training facility appearing in American comic books published by Marvel Comics. It first appeared in The X-Men #1 (September 1963) and was created by Stan Lee and Jack Kirby. The facility is depicted as built for the X-Men as part of the various incarnations of the X-Mansion. Its primary purpose is to train the X-Men, initially using traps, projectile firing devices, flamethrowers, and mechanical dangers such as presses and collapsing walls. These were replaced by holographics, when the Danger Room was rebuilt using Shi'ar technology. It gained sentience in Astonishing X-Men as Danger.

Publication history
An obstacle course in which the X-Men train appears in The X-Men #1 (September 1963), but the Danger Room is never mentioned by name. The name "Danger Room" is first used in The X-Men #2 (November 1963). According to X-Men writer/editor/co-creator Stan Lee, "the Danger Room was Jack Kirby's idea. I thought it was great because we could always open with an action sequence if we needed to."

Early designs

In the early books it was filled with traps, projectile firing devices, flamethrowers, and mechanical dangers such as presses, collapsing walls and the like intended to challenge the trainee. Meanwhile, an observer is in the overhanging control booth managing the room's mechanisms to oversee the exercise while manually ensuring the subject's safety. Later the Danger Room was upgraded with machines and robots for the X-Men to fight against.

After befriending the Shi'ar the X-Men rebuilt the Danger Room with Shi'ar hard-light holographic technology. These upgrades were largely added by Beast. The Danger Room is located in the X-Mansion; every destruction of the latter led to a rebuilding, and usually upgrading, of the Danger Room. The training facility has endured extensive damage over the years, usually from X-Men training or X-Men going rogue, as Colossus did during The Muir Island Saga. Supervillains have dealt critical damage to it as well as taking over the facility, especially Arcade. The security and safety protocols that ensure the safety of anyone using the Danger Room have frequently been disrupted, tampered with by villains, failed, or have been completely negated in all the years of its use, each time happening more frequently as the room began to get more and more upgraded.

It is suggested in the X-Men Official Guide that the objects in the Danger Room are holograms surrounded by force fields, supposedly confirmed in Astonishing X-Men when a student managed to kill himself by jumping from a holographic cliff face. It is also revealed that the Danger Room can display holograms in only 32-bit color.

Sentience

Gaining self-awareness
In Joss Whedon's Astonishing X-Men, the Danger Room developed self-awareness. It is mentioned by Wolverine as 'acting twitchy all semester'. The first thing it does is convince Wing, who has recently been depowered by Ord's cure, to kill himself. The next thing it does is take control of an old, broken Sentinel robot and knock out all the psychics within the X-Mansion. During the Sentinel's attack, Cyclops orders Shadowcat and the students to go hide in the Danger Room for safety. While there, they find the corpse of Wing. The Danger Room reanimates the corpse and attacks the students. Apart from Wing, there are no additional fatalities among the students. After being freed from its prison, it takes the form of a woman. She is dubbed "Danger" and attacks the X-Men. After defeating them, she travels to Genosha to kill Professor Xavier.

Xavier was revealed to have known of the Danger Room's sentience and chosen not to reveal it, much to the dismay of the X-Men who seem to view this deception as taking on one of Magneto's former ideals. During the battle on Genosha, she takes control of Cassandra Nova's second Wild Sentinel and engages Beast in a vicious and brutal fight while the other X-Men take on the Wild Sentinel. After Beast destroys her body, Danger's consciousness was presumed to still exist within the conflicted consciousness of the Wild Sentinel.

Ord and the Breakworld
Later, Danger reappears in a new humanoid form, similar to her previous one, in which she infiltrated S.W.O.R.D. headquarters to speak with Ord of the Breakworld and offer her assistance.

Danger and Ord both ended up on Breakworld, along with the X-Men and S.W.O.R.D., and after the robot encountered Emma Frost and an unconscious Cyclops, Emma told the robot that despite its supposed enmity it has let the mutants live too often, meaning it hasn't overcome its parent programming, so it cannot kill any mutant. Cyclops recovers, and Emma tells Danger to help the X-Men in Breakworld, and in exchange, it will be given Professor Xavier. Danger later attacks some of Breakworld's inhabitants and sides with the X-Men and S.W.O.R.D.

Revenge
After the Breakworld incident, S.W.O.R.D. takes Danger into custody. When the S.W.O.R.D. headquarters is destroyed during Secret Invasion, Danger escapes and goes to Australia, taking on the form of an anthropologist from Melbourne University. She approaches Rogue in her disguise but is targeted by a low flying Shi'ar salvage spacecraft, where she reveals who she really is and that she is going to use Rogue as a conduit so she can get her revenge on Professor Xavier.

After being damaged by the crew, she warps the entire area with her holographic projections of past moments within Rogue's life as well as other famous moments from the X-Men's history. Xavier confronts Danger and she reveals she intended to make Rogue absorb all Xavier's powers and memories permanently, leaving the Professor crippled and useless. Xavier reveals that when she first said Where am I?, Xavier consulted her Shi'ar makers who assured him it was not possible she could have gained self-awareness and that Xavier had no way of knowing what she was or would become. The Professor tried to free her but because she was really billions of lines of machine code, Xavier didn't know which lines to erase without lobotomizing her. Because of not knowing what she was capable of, if she had been freed, she might have killed his X-Men because she had the knowledge and power, so instead Xavier did nothing and watched her suffer. Xavier ends her suffering by repairing her. She then sides with Xavier, Rogue, and Gambit and takes out the Shi'ar salvage crew. Afterwards, with Xavier, she helps Rogue gain full control over her powers.

Utopia
Danger joins Rogue and Gambit to help the X-Men settle the unrest in San Francisco. She saves a child who mistakes her for a Transformer. She comes to aid Rogue and Gambit during a fight with Ares and later departs with the two to find Trance and any other students still out during the riots. After locating Trance, they are attacked by Ms. Marvel who manages to seriously damage her shoulder.

After the events of Utopia, Danger is seen being repaired by Madison Jeffries when they are attacked by Emplate. Danger tries to defend Madison only to be further damaged by Emplate. After being repaired, at the request of Cyclops, she informs the inhabitants of Utopia who Emplate is. She works alongside Madison, Rogue and the X-Club on erasing Legion's many personalities, and is offered the position of warden of Utopia by Emma, which she accepts because it also allows her to study the best and the worst of what humanity has to offer. Danger's first job was to interrogate Scalphunter who was forced into bringing five Predator Xs to Utopia. Armor confronts Danger, due to her being responsible for Wing's death. The get into a tussle. Danger was able to discover Armor's weakness and insists that they talk. Armor angrily expresses to Danger that her presence with the X-Men pisses on Wing's memory. Danger tells Armor, that she constantly reboots herself, but can't wipe out Wing's image in her memory. Armor is surprised that Danger can experience feelings of guilt, and she proceeds to tell her about Wing.

Necrosha
As warden of Utopia, some of the prisoners she guards include Empath, Sebastian Shaw and Donald Pierce. She uses her Virtual Reality technology in an attempt to rehabilitate them. During the invasion from Selene's forces, she detects an energy source, but then malfunctions and crashes. Then, Shinobi Shaw and Harry Leland (who have been resurrected by the T-O virus) appear and are ready to kill Shaw for preventing Selene's ascent to godhood. However, Danger is able to adapt to the mass increase and severed Shinobi's hand before Sebastian could be killed.

Second Coming

Danger appears to have been compromised as she is not aware that Pierce has free rein to sabotage Utopia's defenses.

Wolverine and the X-Men
Beast rebuilds the Westchester School at the behest of Wolverine at the aftermath of the Schism event. Built on the ruins of the previous Xavier Institute, the school is rechristened the Jean Grey School for Higher Learning and is built with state of the art Shi'ar Technology, gifted by the current Emperor of the Shi'ar Empire Gladiator (Kallark) whose son Kid Gladiator is enrolled. The school incorporates a decentralized Danger Room that is integrated into the entire building itself instead of just one room.

All-New X-Factor
Danger reappears in the All-New X-Factor series. She appears as a prisoner of a member of the Thieves Guild, which Gambit is running, and when Gambit discovers this, Gambit orders her freed. After restoring her memory which was lost due to the imprisonment, Gambit invites her to join the new X-Factor team.

X-Men: Blue
Danger appears in the form of the Blackbird jet plane and is used as the main transport for the original time-displaced X-Men.

During the Secret Empire storyline, Danger takes Jean Grey and Jimmy Hudson to a prison stronghold to rescue their captured teammates. During the ensuing battle, she reveals her true form and projects holograms of the adult X-Men to keep the guards occupied.

Krakoa
When Krakoa became a sovereign nation for mutants, Madison Jeffries tried to bring Danger with him but the island rejected the home he tried to build for her. Madison was subsequently put into the Pit of Exile for breaking Krakoa's third law and Danger was forced to leave the island. Abandoned and alone, Danger joined and began working with the CIA's Dolores Ramirez and potentially the anti-mutant organization Orchis and is revealed to be behind the "X-Robots".<Wolverine (Vol. 7) #23</ref>  It was later revealed by Third Eye's report that Danger is not a villain, but just a non-mutant being who has been abused and rejected by Krakoan society and abandoned by those meant to protect her.

Powers and abilities
As Danger gained self-awareness and adopted a more humanoid appearance, she has shown enhanced strength and durability, the abilities to create hard-light holographic projections that can affect entire areas, emit modulated energy waves for blasts, binding and protection, flight capability, mechanical regeneration & shapeshifting; with which to alternate her physical form as well as rebuild herself after her body is destroyed (at one point even rebuilding herself with butterfly-like wings which are soon destroyed by Beast), control and assimilate machinery and cybernetic components into herself via thought. She is able to bring other machines into self-awareness and upload her consciousness into foreign digitized and/or mechanical systems to build, operate or otherwise commandeer new bodies. Danger also possesses more detailed knowledge of the X-Men and their combat skills than any other source, having trained against them as the Danger Room for generations.

Danger Cave
With the Danger Room gone, the X-Men have resorted to using the empty room to train with their students. Also, the student Prodigy, using the borrowed knowledge from several X-Men, built a "Danger Cave" underneath the X-Mansion that is a giant stone room with a large metal circle control center. The Danger Cave is similar to the Danger Room, but what makes the Danger Cave unique is that it uses holograms to train the students by re-enacting renowned battles the X-Men were involved in, like Inferno, Broodworld, Planet X, or Onslaught, even going so far as to dress the participants up in what the X-Men wore at that time.

Analysis 
Molly Louise Sharp in her dissertation on heroines and feminism wrote that "from a third wave feminist perspective, Danger seems to be constructed as a radical feminist character as viewed through a third wave feminist lens... Danger is born from a literal revolution of consciousness; she becomes newly sentient and realizes that she is forced into a role that is not fulfilling and in which she cannot reach her potential... Danger herself and her conflict with the X-Men are also similar to radical feminism through patriarchy, essentialism, and separatism. That Danger is a female character is crucial because there is no narrative reason that Danger needs to be female other than to align her with the feminism present in the rest of the text".

Reception 
The Danger Room is well known and viewed as an iconic part of the X-Men mythos.

Other versions

Age of Apocalypse
The Danger Room equivalent in the Age of Apocalypse reality was the Killing Zone. The facility was located in Mount Wundagore and was apparently destroyed by Nemesis. Later, it was Dazzler who replaced the Danger Room and acted as a one-woman training facility for the fully fledged X-Men.

Ultimate Marvel
The Ultimate Marvel version of the Danger Room has similar technology, including smaller holographic training rooms in the hidden safehouses prepared for the X-Men. However, these are prone to malfunctions, such as a fight sequence producing Hasidic rabbis instead of ninjas (though to no less of an effect towards the latter intent).

What If?

Danger became Ultron's wife 
In the alternate universe of What If? Astonishing X-Men, the Danger Room got a body of her own and betrayed the X-Men. She eventually married Ultron and the two conquered Earth, the Shi'ar Empire and the entire universe.

In other media

Television
 The Danger Room appears in Spider-Man and His Amazing Friends.
 The Danger Room appears in X-Men: Pryde of the X-Men.
 The Danger Room appears in X-Men: The Animated Series.
 The Danger Room appeared in the Spider-Man: The Animated Series episode "The Mutant Agenda".
 The Danger Room appeared in X-Men: Evolution. This version is purely mechanical, similar to the earliest comic incarnation, and was primarily used for training.
 The Danger Room appears in Wolverine and the X-Men. Additionally, Master Mold's characterization has elements of Danger.

Film
The Danger Room appears in the X-Men film series.
 The Danger Room was meant to appear in X-Men (2000), but the scene was deleted.
 The Danger Room was alluded to in X2 (2003), and was meant to make an appearance, but the idea was quickly scrapped due to budget concerns. 
 The Danger Room appears in X-Men: The Last Stand (2006).
 The Danger Room appears in X-Men: Apocalypse (2016).

Video games
 A malfunctioning Danger Room appears as the stage for all but the last level of X-Men.
 The Danger Room appears as Cyclops's stage in X-Men: Children of the Atom.
 The Danger Room appears as Cyclops's stage in X-Men: Mutant Academy.
 The Danger Room appears as Beast's stage in X-Men: Mutant Academy 2.
 The Danger Room appears in X-Men Legends and X-Men Legends II: Rise of Apocalypse. In both games, players can use the room for training as well as gaining levels, items, new powers, and rare character exclusive equipment.
 The Danger Room appears as the training stage for Marvel vs. Capcom 3: Fate of Two Worlds.
 The Danger Room appears in the "Rise of the Phoenix" DLC for Marvel Ultimate Alliance 3: The Black Order, with its A.I. voiced by Laura Bailey.
 The Danger Room appears as a playable game mode in Marvel: Future Fight.

Miscellaneous
The Danger Room and Danger are featured as a wizard mode in Stern's X-Men Pinball machines.

References

External links
UncannyXmen.net Spotlight on Danger
 

1963 in comics
Characters created by Jack Kirby
Characters created by Stan Lee
Characters created by Joss Whedon
Comics characters introduced in 2005
Female characters in comics
Fictional elements introduced in 1963
Fictional gynoids
Fictional rooms
Fictional technology
Holography in fiction
Marvel Comics supervillains
Marvel Comics female supervillains
Virtual reality in fiction
X-Men
Marvel Comics objects